Krystyna Maria Łysiak (née Siemieniecka) is a Polish para table tennis player. She is married to her coach Jacek Łysiak and they have a daughter.

References

1979 births
Living people
People from Nowa Sól
Paralympic table tennis players of Poland
Table tennis players at the 2000 Summer Paralympics
Table tennis players at the 2004 Summer Paralympics
Table tennis players at the 2012 Summer Paralympics
Table tennis players at the 2016 Summer Paralympics
Medalists at the 2004 Summer Paralympics
Medalists at the 2016 Summer Paralympics
Paralympic medalists in table tennis
Paralympic gold medalists for Poland
Paralympic silver medalists for Poland
Table tennis players at the 2020 Summer Paralympics
Polish female table tennis players
21st-century Polish women
20th-century Polish women